Valve Records is an Australian record label, releasing records of both local and international alternative artists. The label was created by Paul Curtis in 1994 to support the local bands he was managing. Regurgitator, a band he manages, however, would not see a release on Valve until 2003–2004 after a split with Warner EastWest and the completion of the first Band in a Bubble project in Melbourne's Federation Square.

Artists
Over the past 14 years, Valve's range of artists has included such music artists as: Anubian Lights, Audio Active, Bandito Folk, Boredoms, Broken Doll, Cobra Killer, Ed Kuepper, Curseovdialect, The Datsuns, Dear Nora DJ Me DJ You, Drop the Lime, Dry & Heavy, Ex-Girl, Frikstailers, Full Fathom Five, Future Islands, Kiley Gaffney, Gonzales, I Heart Hiroshima, Ivy, Jakob, Kid606, Messer Chups, Mocky, Mono, New Pants, Ouch My Face, Omar Souleyman, Pangaea, Ponyloaf, Scul Hazzards, Sekiden, Shonen Knife, Sixfthick, Soma Rasa, Stereo Total, Trans Am, ZA! and Zoobombs.

See also
 List of record labels

External links
 Website
 Myspace

Australian independent record labels
Record labels established in 1994
Alternative rock record labels